Upton House was a building in West Ham, Essex (now the London Borough of Newham) on what is now the corner of Lancaster Road and Upton Lane In 1827 it was the birthplace of the surgeon Joseph Lister. In 1893 a temporary church for St Peter's Church, Upton Cross was set up in its gardens, with the house forming the vicarage - the permanent church was later built in the gardens. The vicarage was demolished in 1967-1968 and its site is now occupied by Joseph Lister Court.

References

External links
 

Former buildings and structures in the London Borough of Newham
British country houses destroyed in the 20th century